"The Pointy End" is the eighth episode of the first season of the HBO medieval fantasy television series Game of Thrones. First aired on June 5, 2011, the episode was directed by Daniel Minahan and written by George R. R. Martin, the author of the A Song of Ice and Fire novels on which the show is based.

The plot covers the aftermath of Eddard Stark's capture. While the Lannisters seek to capture his daughters, his son and heir, Robb, raises an army in the North. Meanwhile, Daenerys witnesses a Dothraki raid on a peaceful village, and Jon Snow faces a new threat at the Wall. The episode's title refers to the sword fighting lesson that Jon gave to Arya before their farewell: "Stick them with the pointy end."

The episode was well received by critics, who praised Martin's adaptation of his own work as well as the actors' performances. It was dedicated to Ralph Vicinanza, an executive producer who died of natural causes. In the United States, the episode achieved a viewership of 2.72 million in its initial broadcast. The episode garnered an Emmy Award nomination for Outstanding Costumes for a Series, but lost to The Borgias.

Plot

In the North
Receiving a letter from Sansa (see below), Maester Luwin deduces she is being manipulated by Cersei. Robb gains the respect of Lord "Greatjon" Umber and calls the Stark bannermen to war, leaving Bran in charge of Winterfell.

In The Vale
Ambushed by tribesmen, Tyrion bribes them to escort him and Bronn to Tywin's camp. Catelyn Stark learns from a message that her son Robb has called the banners of the North to war against the Lannisters and that Ned is imprisoned in the dungeons in King's Landing. Catelyn becomes furious with Lysa for not telling her, but nonetheless implores Lysa to help by sending the Knights of the Vale to join Robb, but Lysa, doubting that Robb can beat Tywin Lannister, refuses.

In the Riverlands
Tywin agrees to honor Tyrion's promises to the tribesmen if they join the Lannister forces, and they demand Tyrion accompany them as insurance.

Catelyn reaches the Stark army. Pondering whether to attack Tywin's or Jaime's forces, Robb sends a captured Lannister scout with a message to Tywin, deceiving the scout that Robb is sending all 20,000 men against Tywin.

At the Wall
Jon and Sam return to the Wall with the corpses of Benjen's fellow rangers; although dead for weeks, they show no decay. Mormont informs Jon of events in the south but reminds him of his commitment to the Night's Watch. Jon tries to attack Ser Alliser for mocking Ned and is confined to quarters.

That night, Ghost prompts Jon to investigate Mormont's quarters. He is attacked by a dead ranger, returned to life as a wight, and destroys it with fire. In the morning, the Night's Watch burn all the remains.

In Lhazar
Khal Drogo's khalasar sacks a Lhazareen village to gather funds for ships. As khaleesi, Daenerys demands the raiders marry their captured women rather than enslave them, infuriating raider Mago. Drogo kills him in a duel but is wounded, and reluctantly accepts village healer Mirri Maz Duur's treatment.

In King's Landing
The Lannisters detain Ned and Sansa, but Syrio Forel holds off the Kingsguard, allowing Arya to escape. Arya flees, accidentally killing a stable boy who tries to stop her.

Cersei convinces Sansa to write to Robb, imploring him to come to King's Landing and swear fealty to Joffrey. Joffrey and Cersei reward the City Watch Captain with a lordship, naming Tywin the new Hand of the King and Jaime new Lord Commander of the Kingsguard. Sansa pleads for her father's life, and Joffrey agrees to show mercy if Ned will confess to treason and accept him as the rightful king.

Production

Writing
 
The episode was written by George R. R. Martin, the author of the book A Game of Thrones on which the series is based. Content from this episode is derived from chapters 43, 51-54, 55-58, and 61(Tyrion VI, Arya IV, Sansa IV, Jon VII, Bran VI, Catelyn VIII, Tyrion VII, Sansa V, the early part of Eddard XV, and Daenerys VII). Martin has extensive experience in television writing, but it had been a decade since he had produced a teleplay. He said that he found writing this episode very easy because of his familiarity with the characters and the story, and that the hardest part was "getting used to the new screenwriting software that [he] had to use."

Martin delivered the first draft of the script to the show's executive producers David Benioff and D. B. Weiss on May 1, 2010, admitting that it was probably "too long and too expensive." In fact, one scene that Martin wrote – Robb Stark calling his father's Northern bannermen, with a montage of eight different castles receiving the summons and riding out – was deemed impossible to film.

The first scenes depicting Tyrion descending with Bronn from the Mountains of the Moon and encountering the clansmen were not written by Martin. Since they were originally intended to be part of episode seven, they were written by that episode's authors, David Benioff and D. B. Weiss. As often happens in TV production, the scene was moved from one episode to another during editing.

The scene where Drogo fights Mago was not in the original script, but Momoa suggested it after realizing that Drogo, supposedly a great warrior, had never had his fighting prowess shown onscreen.

Casting
"The Pointy End" includes the first appearance of two significant recurring characters in the book series: Clive Mantle as the Northern bannerman Lord Jon Umber, known as the Greatjon due to his size, and Ian Gelder as Lord Tywin's brother and right-hand man Ser Kevan Lannister.

Filming locations
Interior scenes were filmed at The Paint Hall studio, in Belfast, including all the scenes set in the Red Keep and Winterfell. The exterior of the Stark and Lannister war camps were shot on location in the Castle Ward estate, near the village of Strangford. Audley's Castle in the estate doubled as the ruined remains of one of Moat Cailin's towers, seen when Catelyn and Rodrik join Robb's army.

The scenes at the village of the Lamb Men that is sacked by the Dothraki were filmed towards the end of October 2010 in Malta, at the farming town of Manikata. For the exterior of the Red Keep where Arya recovers her sword Needle, San Anton Palace was used.

Dedication
The episode was dedicated to the memory of Ralph Vicinanza. He had been one of the co-executive producers attached to Game of Thrones, and died in his sleep from a cerebral aneurysm on September 25, 2010. Vicinanza was the literary agent who handled George R. R. Martin's foreign language rights, and (with Vince Gerardis) one of the co-founders of the management company Created By, which aimed at developing feature films and television shows based on the works of Vicinanza's clients. He was instrumental in bringing Martin's work to the screen, recommending the books to David Benioff and D. B. Weiss, and leading the negotiations with HBO. He died a few days after HBO greenlighted the series.

Reception

Ratings
The episode was seen by 2.7 million viewers for the first airing, a season high, and by another additional 900,000 for the repeat. It therefore obtained a total audience of 3.6 million for the night.

Critical response
"The Pointy End" was well received by critics. Among the most enthusiastic was Maureen Ryan from AOL TV, who called it "the best episode yet," and wrote that she was "extremely impressed with how many moving parts were deployed smoothly and how the hour just flowed." Review aggregator Rotten Tomatoes surveyed 18 reviews of the episode and judged 100% of them to be positive with an average score of 9.25 out of 10. The website's critical consensus reads, ""The Pointy End" is a fast-paced transitional episode which, though written by source novelist George R.R. Martin, proves the show is now finding its own way as a separate entity from the books." IGN's Matt Fowler remarked that this mostly Ned-less episode was very busy; he enjoyed that Robb got to share the spotlight as viewers witnessed part of his "maturation."

The episode's multiple perspectives were commented on: James Hibberd wrote for Entertainment Weekly that "for a show that can often seem disjointed due by having so many storylines unfolding in different locations, this was the most cohesive episode we've seen yet, as the entire realm was impacted by Ned Stark being arrested for treason." At HitFix, Alan Sepinwall called it "by far the busiest episode of the series to date," remarking that it not only moved "pieces around the chess board to set things up for the season's final two episodes," but also included "some crackling dialogue, a few good character moments and some of the best action the show has featured to date." David Sims from the A.V. Club wrote that the episode "masterfully kept us abreast of everything going on, while sticking to the point-of-view style the show has held from the start." On his blog Cultural Learnings, reviewer Myles McNutt found the episode "filled with moments where much is done with very little. We don't really spend a sustained period in any one location, with only brief scenes possible to establish some pretty substantial story developments."

Many critics considered that a great part of the episode's merits were due to George R. R. Martin's script. Sepinwall felt that "Martin didn't get the easiest draw when he wound up having to dramatize the events depicted in 'The Pointy End,' " but still loved the results. Mo Ryan concluded that anyone who was doubting whether Martin had forgotten about writing television scripts should now put their doubts to rest. The "expert" review from the A.V. Club by Emily VanDerWerff noted "a definite sense of Martin's hand at work here. Characters that have never quite worked onscreen—like Sansa—suddenly feel much more alive. Characters that have been working—like Tyrion and Arya—get lots of fun stuff to play that never once feels labored."

The scenes with Sansa Stark were also noted. According to Elio Garcia from westeros.org, "Sophie Turner really shines in her scenes. There are a lot of people out there who judge Sansa very harshly, but you would have to have a heart of stone not to sympathize with her plight in this episode." Many reviewers agreed with this sentiment, commenting on the transition from a "spoiled brat" to a young, confused, but courageous teenager were noted by several reviewers positively. Times reviewer James Poniewozik emphasized the growth of Robb Stark's character, praising both Martin's writing and Richard Madden's acting. Maureen Ryan highlighted the scene where Syrio Forel confronts the Lannister men to allow Arya's escape, which she considered masterfully staged.

Awards and nominations

References

External links

 "The Pointy End" at HBO
 

2011 American television episodes
Game of Thrones (season 1) episodes
Television episodes written by George R. R. Martin